This is a list of airlines currently operating in Svalbard.

See also
 List of airlines

Svalbard
Airlines
Transport in Svalbard
Airlines of Norway